Gordon Edwards is a Canadian scientist and nuclear consultant.  Edwards was born in Canada in 1940, and graduated from the University of Toronto in 1961 with a gold medal in Mathematics and Physics and a Woodrow Wilson Fellowship.  At the University of Chicago he obtained two master's degrees, one in Mathematics (1962) and one in English Literature (1964). In 1972, he obtained a Ph.D. in Mathematics from Queen's University.

From 1970 to 1974, he was the editor of Survival magazine. In 1975 he co-founded the Canadian Coalition for Nuclear Responsibility, and has been its president since 1978. Edwards has worked widely as a consultant on nuclear issues and has been qualified as a nuclear expert by courts in Canada and elsewhere.

In 1972–73, Edwards was the assistant director of a nationwide study of the Mathematical Sciences in Canada conducted under the auspices of the Science Council of Canada.

Edwards has written articles and reports on radiation standards, radioactive wastes, uranium mining, nuclear proliferation, the economics of nuclear power, non-nuclear energy strategies. He has been featured on radio and television programs including David Suzuki's The Nature of Things, Pierre Berton's The Great Debate, and many others. He has worked as consultant for governmental bodies such as the Auditor General of Canada, the Select Committee on Ontario Hydro Affairs, and the Ontario Royal Commission on Electric Power Planning. In 2006, Edwards received the Nuclear-Free Future Award. He has also been awarded the Rosalie Bertell Lifetime Achievement Award and the YMCA Peacemaker Medallion.
He is a retired teacher of mathematics and science at Vanier College in Montreal.

See also
Anti-nuclear movement in Canada

References

External links
The Great Debate: Gordon Edwards vs Edward Teller
How I Became a Nuclear Skeptic
Canada and the Bomb: Past and Future 

Canadian Coalition for Nuclear Responsibility

1940 births
Living people
Canadian anti–nuclear power activists
University of Toronto alumni
University of Chicago alumni
Canadian expatriates in the United States